Circaea lutetiana, known as broad-leaved enchanter's nightshade, is a plant in the evening primrose family, Onagraceae.

The genus name comes from the enchantress Circe of Greek mythology and the specific designation is derived from Lutetia, the Latin name for Paris, which was sometimes referred to as the "Witch City". Despite its name it is not especially toxic, but contains a lot of the astringent tannin.

Description

Circaea lutetiana is a perennial herbaceous plant with opposite, simple leaves, on slender, green stems. The flowers are white, borne in summer. It grows   20 cm  to 60 cm, rarely up to 75 centimeters high.

The leaves are rounded or slightly notched at the base, they  narrow gradually to the pointed tip and are  not strongly toothed, but have sinuate edges. The leaf stalks are equally hairy all round.

The flower has 2 notched petals, 2 stamens and a 2-lobed stigma. The  open flowers are well spaced along the stalk and there are no bracts at base of individual flower stalks. The fruit consists of 2 equal cells, and usually sets seed. The flower stalks become angled downwards before fruiting. The fruit is a small bur 3.5-5mm which aids the plant's dispersal via zoochory.

In winter the aerial parts die off leaving an underground rhizome.

Circaea alpina will hybridize with Circaea lutetiana producing sterile offspring that persists in vegetative colonies.

Distribution
The plant is native to Europe, Middle Asia, and Siberia. North American populations are now considered to be a separate species, Circaea canadensis. It grows in woods in deep shade and moist environments on nitrogen-containing clay.

Gardening
It is cultivated as an ornamental garden plant. It prefers a shaded position in rich, moist soil. The cultivar 'Caveat Emptor' has leaves that are heavily mottled pink.

References

lutetiana
Plants described in 1753
Taxa named by Carl Linnaeus
Medicinal plants